Zographetus ogygia, the purple spotted flitter, is a butterfly belonging to the family Hesperiidae.

Distribution
From southern India and Sikkim to Malaya, Thailand, Laos, Borneo, Sumatra, Nias, Banka, Java.

Description
In 1866, William Chapman Hewitson described this butterfly as:

Life history
The larvae feed on Aganope thyrsiflora.

References

Hesperiinae
Butterflies of Asia
Butterflies of Indochina